José Celso de Mello Filho (Tatuí, November 1, 1945), is a Brazilian jurist, former member of the Supreme Federal Court of Brazil. He was nominated by President José Sarney in 1989.

He became the youngest President of the Court in 1997.

On September 25, 2020, Celso de Mello announced his early retirement to October 13, before the limit date of November 1, when the dean of the Supreme Court will turn 75.

References

Brazilian jurists
Supreme Federal Court of Brazil justices
1945 births
Living people
People from Tatuí
Robert E. Lee High School (Jacksonville) alumni
University of São Paulo alumni